Pangantucan, officially the Municipality of Pangantucan, is a 1st class municipality in the province of Bukidnon, Philippines. According to the 2020 census, it has a population of 56,580 people.

History
The name “Pangantucan”, meaning wisdom and strength, is dedicated to a white stallion. The horse uprooted a bamboo stalk in time to warn his master, a datu of the tribe, of the impending threat of Manobo raiders, thereby saving the tribe from massacre.

Pangantucan was once a barrio of Maramag, and as the seat of government it was merged in 1931 with neighbouring Adtuyon, Dominorog, Panalagsagan, Kalilangan and Barandias to form a separate municipal district. It was granted Municipal status in 1961.

Geography

Pangantucan is one of 20 municipalities in the Province of Bukidnon. Wao, Lanao del Sur, can be reached through a  concrete/gravel paved national road south from the municipality.

The Municipality of Pangantucan is bounded on the south-west side by the province of Lanao del Sur and by the province of North Cotabato on the southern part. The Municipality of Kalilangan lies at the western part of the municipality while on its north-west portion is the Mount Kitanglad Range. Valencia, regarded as the trade center of Bukidnon bounds Pangantucan on its northern part while Maramag and the Municipalities of Don Carlos and Kadingilan are found on its east and south side respectively.

It composed of 19 barangays, all of which are accessible on summer days by motor vehicle fit for the bad roads.

Located in Barangay Pigtauranan are the lakes Napalit and Mata. Lake Napalit is a tectonic lake situated outside the range of Mt. Kalatungan. The lake supplies fishes like tilapia, gurami, carp, mudfish and catfish. It has an area of around 36 hectares and an estimated depth of 80 feet. According to the native folks, there used to be 24 islets floating in the lake. To date, only one islet stands. The Department of Tourism declared the lake as a natural park. Around 1 kilometer away from Lake Napalit is Lake Mata. In between the two lakes is a marsh settled with naturally bonsai-ed trees and tikog plants.  Tikog is harvested, treated and processed by the women into mats, bags, placemats and other handicrafts.

Topography
The terrain of Pangantucan is characterized by slightly undulating and rolling upland areas. In fact, 62 percent of the municipal land area features rolling or hilly terrain with slopes ranging from 18 percent to 50 percent. Only about 14 percent is suitable for agricultural production. Its ranges occupy about 21 percent of the municipality's total land area.

Climate
The climate of Pangantucan is of Type IV of the Modified Corona's Climate Classification. It is characterized by more or less evenly distributed rainfall throughout the year with rare incidence of tropical cyclone. Rainfall distribution variation (Figure 1) is influenced by rain shadow effect of the mountainous belt on the eastern side of Bukidnon and by the presence of adjoining hills and mountain ranges.

Note that abnormally low values during the time from December 1997 to May 1998 coincided with drought months.

Barangays
Pangantucan is politically subdivided into 19 barangays.

Demographics

In the 2010 census, the population of Pangantucan stood at 48,775 people, up from 46,689 in 2007. Its density was 205 persons per square kilometer. It registered a population growth of 1.64 percent based on the 1990-2007 census of population. Available data indicated that the population has steadily been increasing from 1976 up to the present. Of the total population 51.45% are male and the rest are the female population.

Economy

The Poblacion is the nucleus of growth within the municipality. It is the center of both government and commercial activities, and the site of various establishments, services, and facilities.

Outside the Poblacion are the rural areas where the majority of the population reside, and whose prime economic activity is farming. Agriculture is the major land user with an aggregate are of 17,429 hectares devoted to its use. Of this area, 4,806 hectares are planted with corn and 1,121 hectares are planted with rice. Commercial/industrial and other crops account for some 11,502 hectares.

Banana, pineapple, and papaya plantation also utilize vast lands in the area. Landowners rent out their lands to big companies for a contract of a period that spans 20 years. In favor of the landowners, the companies then gave them priority to work in the plantation.

In addition livestock and poultry are also major sources of livelihood in Pangantucan, Total livestock in 2002 reached 20,276. On the other hand, poultry production was reported at 56,710 for the same period.

Supporting the agricultural activities in the municipality are about 74 tractors, 6 rice thresher, 97 corn shellers, 19 rice/corn mills, 6 mechanical dryers, 128 multi-purpose pavement and 5 storage/warehousing facilities.

Commerce and trade play a significant role in Pangantucan economy. Some 232 commercial establishments are reported in the area of which about 4 engaged in a wholesale activity. Among such wholesale establishments include 2 branches of the BS Garces Payless Mart chain of stores – a 2-storey building within the public market-bus terminal area and a 3-storey building with a mezzanine along the main highway.

References

External links
 [ Philippine Standard Geographic Code]
 Philippine Census Information

Municipalities of Bukidnon